Matilda Garrett (born 11 August 1998) is an Australian netball player in the Suncorp Super Netball league, playing for the Adelaide Thunderbirds.

Career
Garrett was selected by the Magpies prior to the start of the 2018 season having previously represented Australia at under 21 level and captained her native state of Victoria at under 19 level. Before being picked by Collingwood, Garrett was on the club's training list in 2017 and enjoyed a breakout season with Tasmanian Magpies in the Australian Netball League . Garrett grew up playing netball in the suburb of Narre Warren South.

Garrett finished the 2020 season with the Collingwood Magpies and was then informed she would not receive a contract for the 2021 season. Adelaide Thunderbirds then signed Matilda for 2021.

Statistics
Statistics are correct to the end of the 2018 season.

|- style="background-color: #eaeaea"
! scope="row" style="text-align:center" | 2018
|style="text-align:center;"|Magpies
| 0/0 || 0 || 2 || 6 || 0 || 3 || 13 || 76 || 2 || 8 
|- 
! scope="row" style="text-align:center" | 2019
|style="text-align:center;"|Magpies
| 0/0 || 0 || 0 || 0 || 0 || 0 || 0 || 0 || 0 || 0
|- class="sortbottom"
! colspan=2| Career
! 0/0
! 0
! 2
! 6
! 0
! 3
! 13
! 76
! 2
! 8
|}

Personal life
Garrett is currently studying a Bachelor of Exercise and Sport Science at Deakin University, after initially studying a Bachelor of Education (Primary).

References

External links
 Magpies Netball profile
 Super Netball profile
 Netball Draft Central profile

1998 births
Australian netball players
Collingwood Magpies Netball players
Living people
Suncorp Super Netball players
Victorian Netball League players
Netball players from Melbourne
Tasmanian Magpies players
Australian Netball League players
People from Narre Warren